Drilon Cenaj (born 12 September 1997) is a Kosovan professional footballer who plays as a midfielder for Prishtina.

Club career

Early career
Cenaj is a product of youth team systems of the different Bosnian and Hungarian sides. On 15 September 2015, he signed with under-19 team of Chievo after agreeing to a multiyear deal.

Salernitana
On 2 August 2016, Cenaj signed his first professional contract with Serie B side Salernitana after agreeing to a one-year deal. Five days later, he was named as a Salernitana substitute for the first time in the second round of 2016–17 Coppa Italia against Benevento, but was an unused substitute in that match.

Velež Mostar
On 10 March 2017, Cenaj joined First League of FBiH side Velež Mostar. On 8 April 2017, he made his debut in a 3–0 away defeat against Budućnost Banovići after being named in the starting line-up.

Novigrad
On 1 August 2017, Cenaj joined Croatian Second Football League side Novigrad. On 19 August 2017, he made his debut in a 1–1 home draw against Varaždin after coming on as a substitute at 56th minute in place of Nemanja Belaković.

Pandurii Târgu Jiu
On 19 February 2018, Cenaj joined Liga II side Pandurii Târgu Jiu. On 10 March 2018, he made his debut in a 2–1 home win against Mioveni after coming on as a substitute at 83rd minute in place of Brian Lemac.

Botev Vratsa
On 9 January 2019, Cenaj joined Bulgarian First Professional Football League side Botev Vratsa.

Viitorul Târgu Jiu
On 10 February 2019, Cenaj joined Liga II side Viitorul Târgu Jiu. On 23 February 2019, he made his debut in a 0–2 away defeat against Universitatea Cluj after being named in the starting line-up.

Nyíregyháza
On 12 July 2019, Cenaj joined Nemzeti Bajnokság II side Nyíregyháza. On 18 August 2019, he made his debut in a 3–0 home win against Békéscsaba after being named in the starting line-up.

Čelik Zenica
On 17 February 2020, Cenaj joined Bosnian Premier League side Čelik Zenica after agreeing to a one-and-a-half-year deal. Six days later, he made his debut in a 0–2 away defeat against Zrinjski Mostar after coming on as a substitute at 46th minute in place of Marko Perišić.

Tuzla City
On 26 June 2020, Cenaj joined Bosnian Premier League side Tuzla City. However, less than two months later, on 18 August, he suddenly left the club.

Prishtina
On 21 January 2022, Cenaj signed for Prishtina.

References

External links

1997 births
Living people
Sportspeople from Gjakova
Association football midfielders
Kosovan footballers
U.S. Salernitana 1919 players
FK Velež Mostar players
NK Novigrad players
CS Pandurii Târgu Jiu players
FC Botev Vratsa players
ACS Viitorul Târgu Jiu players
Nyíregyháza Spartacus FC players
NK Čelik Zenica players
FK Tuzla City players
Szentlőrinci SE footballers
FC Prishtina players
First League of the Federation of Bosnia and Herzegovina players
First Football League (Croatia) players
Liga II players
Nemzeti Bajnokság II players
Premier League of Bosnia and Herzegovina players
Kosovan expatriate footballers
Expatriate footballers in Italy
Kosovan expatriate sportspeople in Italy
Expatriate footballers in Bosnia and Herzegovina
Kosovan expatriate sportspeople in Bosnia and Herzegovina
Expatriate footballers in Croatia
Kosovan expatriate sportspeople in Croatia
Expatriate footballers in Romania
Kosovan expatriate sportspeople in Romania
Expatriate footballers in Bulgaria
Kosovan expatriate sportspeople in Bulgaria
Expatriate footballers in Hungary
Kosovan expatriate sportspeople in Hungary